Patnanungan, officially the Municipality of Patnanungan,  is a 5th class municipality in the province of Quezon, Philippines. According to the 2020 census, it has a population of 15,052 people.

A shoe-shaped island municipality facing the Philippine Sea, it has various island and islet borders like Burdeos, Jomalig Island, Pollilo Strait, Lamon Bay and Palasan Island. It is part of the Polillo Islands. It has different destinations that are not popular since Patnanungan was far away from Quezon City.

• Villa Karrine

• Snake Island

• Tinagong Pantay Cave

• Pacabalu Sandbar

• Pula Lupa

Geography

Barangays
Patnanungan is politically subdivided into 7 barangays.
 Amaga
 Busdak
 Kilogan
 Luod
 Patnanungan Norte
 Patnanungan Sur (Poblacion)
 Tapul

Climate

Demographics

Economy

Government

Elected officials
Municipal council (2019-2022):

See also
 List of islands of the Philippines

References

External links
Patnanungan Profile at PhilAtlas.com
[ Philippine Standard Geographic Code]
Philippine Census Information
Local Governance Performance Management System

Municipalities of Quezon
Islands of Quezon
Island municipalities in the Philippines